The Nariva Formation is a geologic formation in Trinidad and Tobago. It preserves fossils dating back to the Paleogene period.

See also 

 List of fossiliferous stratigraphic units in Trinidad and Tobago

References

Further reading 
 W. A. van den Bold. 1957. Ostracoda from the Paleocene of Trinidad. Micropaleontology 3(1):1-18

Geologic formations of Trinidad and Tobago
Paleogene Trinidad and Tobago